Will is the memoir of British writer Will Self. It was first published in the United Kingdom in 2019. The book documents various stages of his life, starting at Self's childhood in a quiet North London suburb, through his education at Oxford and his eventual descent into drug addiction.

References 

2019 non-fiction books
British memoirs
English non-fiction books
Viking Press books